Bara Bankuya (also called Bararankuya) is a village, in Ramnagar II CD block in Contai subdivision of Purba Medinipur district in the state of West Bengal, India.

Geography

Location
Bara Bankuya is located at

CD block HQ
The headquarters of Ramnagar II CD block are located at Bara Bankuya.

Urbanisation
93.55% of the population of Contai subdivision live in the rural areas. Only 6.45% of the population live in the urban areas and it is considerably behind Haldia subdivision in urbanization, where 20.81% of the population live in urban areas.

Note: The map alongside presents some of the notable locations in the subdivision. All places marked in the map are linked in the larger full screen map.

Demographics
As per 2011 Census of India Bara Bankuya had a total population of 6,169 of which 3,077 (50%) were males and 3,092 (50%) were females. Population below 6 years was 676. The total number of literates in Bara Bankuya was 4,919 (89.55% of the population over 6 years).

Transport
SH 4 connecting Jhalda (in Purulia district) and Digha (in Purba Medinipur district) passes through Bara Bankuya.

Healthcare
Bararankura Rural Hospital, at Bararankura, PO Balisai (with 30 beds) is the main medical facility in Ramnagar II CD block. There are primary health centres at Nijmaithula, PO Batatala (with 10 seats) and Hamirpur, PO Depal (with 2 seats).

References

Villages in Purba Medinipur district